Metachanda citrodesma is a moth species in the oecophorine tribe Metachandini. It was described by Edward Meyrick in 1912. Its type locality is in South Africa. The species also occurs on São Tomé, Príncipe and in Malawi.

References

Oecophorinae
Moths described in 1912
Taxa named by Edward Meyrick
Moths of Africa